Isaac Milo Kittleson (1874–1958) was Mayor of Madison, Wisconsin. He held the office from 1920 to 1925.

His former home, now known as the Curtis-Kittleson House, is listed on the National Register of Historic Places. The house was also lived in by Madison Mayor William Dexter Curtis.

References

Mayors of Madison, Wisconsin
1874 births
1958 deaths